Bangladesh–Thailand relations refer to foreign relations between Bangladesh  and Thailand. Relations were established on 5 October 1972. Thailand opened its embassy in Bangladesh in 1974, and Bangladesh opened its embassy in Bangkok in 1975.

Trade
Trade relations between Bangladesh and Thailand grow stronger with each passing year, particularly with regard to commodity relations. Thailand, as a more developed country, sees many Bengali students coming over to study the sciences. Bangladesh has suggested that Thailand participate more actively in its economic sphere. According to the Minister of Finance of Bangladesh - Thailand is still able to increase its contribution to the economy of Bangladesh.

On 2 May 2010, it became known that Thailand would hold a four-day trade fair in Bangladesh. This event was attended by 47 Thai companies (in the improvement of trade relations between the two countries). Currently, the volume of trade between Thailand and Bangladesh is about $650 million. Thailand is also a very famous country for Bangladeshis to travel to, as Dhaka and Bangkok flights are only for 2 and a half hours in between. Thai food is very famous in Bangladesh, as there is a great appreciation of Thai culture with Bangladeshi people.

See also

 Foreign relations of Bangladesh
 Foreign relations of Thailand

References

 
Thailand
Bilateral relations of Thailand